A Darker Shade of Magic is an adult fantasy novel by American author V.E. Schwab published by Tor Books in 2015. It is the first installment of the Shades of Magic trilogy.

Plot summary 
As a young Antari magician, Kell is one of the last magicians with the rare ability to travel between the four parallel Londons, which he calls Red, Grey, White, and Black.

Kell officially serves the royal family of Red London, The Maresh Empire,  as an ambassador, traveling between worlds to deliver messages, letters of importance and other such news. However, Kell has a secret life as a smuggler, servicing people willing to pay for even the smallest glimpses of magic. It's a risky pastime with dangerous consequences.

After a smuggling job goes wrong, Kell escapes to Grey London where he finds Delilah Bard, a young thief looking for a taste of adventure and a chance at something more. Delilah first saves Kell, then captures him and talks him into going with him. In a world with magic, it's of course unavoidable that things go horribly wrong along the way.

Reception 
The Guardian called A Darker Shade of Magic "a compelling, swashbuckling read reminiscent of Tim Powers’ more gung-ho fantasies". It received a starred review from Publishers Weekly.

Film adaptation 
On February 3, 2016, it was announced that Gerard Butler's production company G-BASE have acquired rights to adapt the book as a limited TV series.

However, a year later, on February 24, 2017, it was reported that a movie would be produced instead, and that Sony Pictures won the movie rights, beating Fox 2000, eOne, and Lionsgate. With the format change, Schwab has become one of the producers of the movie alongside Robinson, Alan Siegel, and Neal Moritz. Toby Ascher from Original Productions is the executive producer, and Executive Matthew Milam and Sanford Panitch, the president of Sony Pictures, are set to oversee production.

On October 3, 2019, the movie's screenwriter was announced: Derek Kolstad, the creator of the John Wick franchise.

Sequels  
The second installment of the Shades of Magic series, titled A Gathering of Shadows, was released on February 23, 2016. The third book in the series, A Conjuring of Light, was released February 21 2017.

References

2015 American novels
2015 fantasy novels
American fantasy novels
Tor Books books